Rodney H. Hughes (August 2, 1925 – November 19, 2005) was a former member of the Ohio House of Representatives, serving the 78th District from 1967 to 1990. Born in Harrod, Ohio Hughes served as mayor of Bellefontaine from 1962 to 1967 prior to his election to the House of Representatives. Hughes was a Combat Staff Sergeant in the 358th Division of the 90th Infantry and received a Purple Heart and Bronze Star. He lived in Huntsville at the time of his death.

References

External links
The Ohio House of Representatives: Rep. Rodney Hughes (R-Marysville)

1925 births
Republican Party members of the Ohio House of Representatives
2005 deaths
20th-century American politicians
People from Harrod, Ohio
Mayors of places in Ohio
People from Bellefontaine, Ohio